Campus Girls is a 1995 Philippine drama film directed by Mac Alejandre on his directorial debut. The film stars Vina Morales, Donna Cruz, Donita Rose and Geneva Cruz as the titular kolehiyalas.

The film is streaming online on YouTube.

Cast

Vina Morales as Vangie
Donna Cruz as Georgie
Donita Rose as Samantha
Geneva Cruz as Diane
Chanda Romero as Aling Pilar
Gary Estrada as Bogs
Marjorie Barretto as Margie
Elizabeth Oropesa as Becky
Dante Rivero as Andy
Caridad Sanchez as Mamoo
Ian de Leon as Louie
Ronaldo Valdez as Ramon
Lander Vera-Perez	as Mike
Alona Alegre as Cory
Amy Austria as Criselda
Richard Bonnin as Dante
Gina Alajar as Mrs. Rosales
James Apilado	as Boyet
Shaina Magdayao as Bunny
Michael Vera-Perez as Michael
Rommel Montano as Rommel
Jaymee Hizon as Jaimee
Erwin as Erwin
Joemar Cruz as Joey
Charmaigne Santanera as Myrna
Milina Jacoway as Jenny
Jessa Zaragoza as Pinky
Richard de Dios as Francis
Noni Mauricio as Chito
Lennon Serrano as Lennon
Kenneth Garcia as Kenneth

Release
Vina Morales walked out of Campus Girlss premiere on January 25, 1995 after realizing that most of her scenes were edited out of the film.

References

External links

Full Movie on Viva Films

1995 films
Filipino-language films
Films directed by Mac Alejandre
Philippine drama films
Viva Films films